Matilde Fernández (born 24 January 1950) is a Spanish social feminist and politician who served as minister of social affairs of Spain from 1988 to 1993.

Early life
Fernández was born on  24 January 1950 in Madrid.

Career
Fernández was a member and the leader of the labor union movement. She joined the Spanish Socialist Workers' Party (PSOE), being part of the reformist group within it. In 1984, she became a member of the PSOE's federal executive committee and was appointed head of the secretariat for women’s participation.

She was appointed minister of social affairs to the cabinet led by Prime Minister Felipe Gonzales in 1988. Fernández became the first minister of social affairs since the ministry was established by her appointment. She was backed by the PSOE group led by Alfonso Guerra. She was replaced by Cristina Alberdi in the post in 1993. In the Spanish Congress, she represented Cantabria from 1989 to 2000. In 2000, she ran for the PSOE presidency, but lost election to José Luis Zapatero. Her candidacy was backed by the faction called guerristas.

References

External links

20th-century Spanish women politicians
1950 births
Government ministers of Spain
Living people
Madrid city councillors (1999–2003)
Members of the 4th Congress of Deputies (Spain)
Members of the 5th Congress of Deputies (Spain)
Members of the 6th Congress of Deputies (Spain)
Politicians from Madrid
Spanish feminists
Spanish Socialist Workers' Party politicians
Women government ministers of Spain